My Dear Desperado (lit. My Gangster Lover) is a 2010 South Korean romantic comedy film written and directed by Kim Kwang-sik, and starring Park Joong-hoon and Jung Yu-mi as two people who become semi-basement one-room neighbors: brave yet jobless Se-jin and Dong-chul, the neighborhood gangster who always gets beaten up. The film received 688,832 admissions nationwide. This film was remade in Hindi titled Jayantabhai Ki Luv Story in 2013.

Plot
University graduate Han Se-jin (Jung Yu-mi) leaves her hometown, where her conservative father (Min Kyeong-jin) is the local stationmaster, for Seoul, where she has been offered a job in an IT company. Some time later, however, the company goes bankrupt and she's forced to move into a cheap basement flat while job-hunting. Her new neighbor is middle-aged Oh Dong-chul (Park Joong-hoon), a small-time gangster who works for boss Kim (Jeong Woo-hyeok) collecting loans. Se-jin is initially uncomfortable living next door to a gangster but later forms a wary friendship with him after he helps her out a couple of times. Depressed by her inability to get a job because of the economic recession, Se-jin ends up drinking with Dong-chul one evening and having a one-night stand with him. She later asks him to pose as her wealthy boyfriend on a trip home to visit her anxious father — though that doesn't quite go as planned, and Se-jin ends up staying on with her father. Meanwhile, Dong-chul, who has almost started a gang war back in Seoul by beating up some hapkido athletes in revenge, is told by boss Kim to formally apologize to the athletes' boss, former police detective Park (Jeong In-gi). Dong-cheol reluctantly agrees, but that same day Se-jin is due in Seoul for an important job interview.

Cast
Park Joong-hoon ... Oh Dong-chul 
Jung Yu-mi ... Han Se-jin 
Park Won-sang ... Jong-seo, the gang deputy 
Jeong Woo-hyeok ... Kim, the gang boss 
Jung In-gi ... Park, the ex-detective
Kwon Se-in  ... Jae-young, the young gangster
Min Kyeong-jin ... Se-jin's father 
Noh Seung-beom ... Bong-soo
Lee Sang-hee ... real estate agent
Im Ki-hong ... Min Ki-ho, the harasser
Park Jong-hyeon ... interview president
Lee Jun-hyeok ... final interviewer
Son Jin-hwan ... final interviewer
Kim Dong-chan ... uninterested interviewer
Yu Ji-yeon ... interview leader
Oh Seong-su ... worker
Song Gyeong-ui ... section chief
Lee Chae-eun ... nurse
Cha Su-mi ... nurse
Yun Ga-hyeon ... woman inspecting apartment
Choi Weon-tae ... high school student
Ju Hyeon-myeong ... high school student
Shin Hye-jeong ... noodle bar owner
Min Ji-min ... hapkido athlete
Jo Weon-cheol ... hapkido athlete
Kim Yong-min ... hapkido athlete
Song Yeong-jae ... song-and-dance interviewer
Han Cheol-woo ... song-and-dance interviewer
Yang Eun-yong ... doctor
Kim Mi-ra ... madam

Awards and nominations

Remakes
The film was made in two Indian languages as Jayantabhai Ki Luv Story in Hindi, Kadhalum Kadandhu Pogum in Tamil and the movie partially inspired the 2014 Bangladeshi film Kistimaat.

References

External links
  
 
 
 

South Korean romantic comedy films
2010 films
2010 romantic comedy films
South Korean films remade in other languages
2010s South Korean films
2010s Korean-language films